The Dicastery for Evangelization is a department (dicastery) of the Roman Curia. It was created on 5 June 2022 through the merger of the Pontifical Council for Promoting the New Evangelization and the Congregation for the Evangelization of Peoples, by the apostolic constitution Praedicate evangelium.

The dicastery is described in Praedicate evangelium as "at the service of the work of evangelization so that Christ, the light of the peoples, may be known and witnessed to in word and deed and that His Mystical Body, which is the Church, may be built up. The Dicastery is responsible for the fundamental questions of evangelization in the world and for the establishment, accompaniment and support of the new particular Churches, without prejudice to the competence of the Dicastery for the Eastern Churches."

Importance 
In Praedicate evangelium, the Dicastery for Evangelization is the first department in the list of departments of the Roman Curia. This is interpreted as meaning the Dicastery for Evangelization is made most important of all departments. For around the past 500 years, the Dicastery for the Doctrine of the Faith and its equivalents were always the most important department. During the press conference presenting the apostolic constitution, Bishop Marco Mellino stated that the order in which the dicasteries appear in Praedicate evangelium had no juridical effect, but that "perhaps" the order of the first three dicasteries did: evangelization (Dicastery for Evangelization) comes before doctrine (Dicastery for the Doctrine of the Faith), and doctrine is closely followed by the Dicastery for the Service of Charity.

Organization 
According to Praedicate evangelium, one section of this dicastery deals with "fundamental questions of evangelization in the world", the other with "first evangelization and the new particular Churches in the territories within its competence". The dicastery is presided over directly by the Roman Pontiff who is its prefect.

Hierarchy 
The following are the list of the prefects and the pro-prefects for the Dicastery for Evangelization. This hierarchy of organization is peculiar to this Dicastery, compared to other dicasteries in the Roman Curia, in that Praedicate evangelium provides for the incumbent pope to serve as its prefect, assisted by two pro-prefects.

There is currently no pro-prefect. The de facto pro-prefects are Luis Antonio Tagle and Archbishop Rino Fisichella, but they have not been officially given those titles.

Prefect

Pro-prefect for the Section of New Evangelization

Pro-prefect for the Section of First Evangelization

References

External links

Dicasteries
Catholic organizations established in the 21st century
2022 establishments in Vatican City